The Dogger Bank incident (also known as the North Sea Incident, the Russian Outrage or the Incident of Hull) occurred on the night of 21/22 October 1904, when the Baltic Fleet of the Imperial Russian Navy mistook a British trawler fleet from Kingston upon Hull in the Dogger Bank area of the North Sea for Imperial Japanese Navy torpedo boats and fired on them. Russian warships also fired on each other in the chaos of the melée. Two British fishermen died, six more were injured, one fishing vessel was sunk, and five more boats were damaged.  On the Russian side, one sailor and a Russian Orthodox priest aboard the cruiser Aurora caught in the crossfire were killed. "Damage to the Aurora was concealed...and only discovered by the deciphering of a wireless message intercepted at [the British] Felixstowe station.  It was  also considered highly significant that no officer from that ship appeared before the Commission, nor were her logs produced." The incident almost led to war between the British Empire and the Russian Empire.

Incident
The Russian warships involved in the incident were en route to the Far East to reinforce the 1st Pacific Squadron stationed at Port Arthur and later Vladivostok during the Russo-Japanese War. Because of the fleet's alleged sightings of balloons and four enemy cruisers the day previously, coupled with "the possibility that the Japanese might surreptitiously have sent ships around the world to attack" them, Russian Admiral Zinovy Rozhestvensky called for increased vigilance and issued an order that "no vessel of any sort must be allowed to get in among the fleet".

It was known that enemy intelligence had been heavily active in the region. Torpedo boats, a recent development of the major navies, had the potential to damage and sink large warships and were very difficult to detect, which caused psychological stress to sailors at war.

While en route, Rozhestvensky received an intelligence report from the Russian transport Bakan in the Langeland Belt of "four torpedo-boats which only showed lights on the mizenmast-head so that at a distance, they might be taken for fishing boats". He took the report seriously, quickened his coaling and commenced sailing.

Similar accidents and rumours affected the Russian fleet. There was a general fear of attack, with widespread rumours that a fleet of Japanese torpedo boats were stationed off the Danish coast, talk of the Japanese having mined the seas and alleged sightings of Japanese submarines. Before the Dogger Bank incident, the nervous Russian fleet had fired on fishermen carrying consular dispatches from Russia to them near the Danish coast. No damage was caused because of the Russian fleet's poor gunnery.

After navigating a non-existent minefield, the Russian fleet sailed into the North Sea. The disaster of 21 October began in the evening, when the captain of the supply ship Kamchatka (Камчатка), which was last in the Russian line, took a passing Swedish ship for a Japanese torpedo boat and radioed that he was being attacked.

The Russian warships illuminated the trawlers with their searchlights and opened fire. As the trawlers had their nets down, they were unable to flee. The British trawler Crane was sunk, and its captain and boatswain were killed. Four other trawlers were damaged, and six other fishermen were wounded, one of whom died a few months later.

In the general chaos, Russian ships began to shoot at each other. The cruisers Aurora and Dmitrii Donskoi were taken for Japanese warships and bombarded by seven battleships sailing in formation, damaging both ships and killing a chaplain and at least one sailor and severely wounding another. During the pandemonium, several Russian ships signalled torpedoes had hit them, and on board the battleship Borodino, rumours spread that the ship was being boarded by the Japanese, with some crews donning life vests and lying prone on the deck and others drawing cutlasses. More serious losses to both sides were avoided only because of the extremely low quality of Russian gunnery, with the battleship Oryol reportedly firing more than 500 shells without hitting anything.

After twenty minutes of firing, the fishermen finally saw a blue light signal on one of the warships, the order to cease firing.

Aftermath 
The incident led to a serious diplomatic conflict between Russia and Britain, which was particularly dangerous because of the Anglo-Japanese Alliance. In the aftermath, some British newspapers called the Russian fleet 'pirates', and Admiral Rozhestvensky was heavily criticised for not leaving the British fishermen lifeboats. The editorial of the morning's Times was particularly scathing: 

The Royal Navy prepared for war, with 28 battleships of the Home Fleet being ordered to raise steam and prepare for action, while British cruiser squadrons shadowed the Russian fleet as it made its way through the Bay of Biscay and down the coast of Portugal. Under diplomatic pressure, the Russian government agreed to investigate the incident, and Rozhestvensky was ordered to dock in Vigo, Spain, where he left behind those officers considered responsible (as well as at least one officer who had been critical of him). From Vigo, the main Russian fleet then approached Tangiers, Morocco, and lost contact with the Kamchatka for several days. The Kamchatka eventually rejoined the fleet and claimed that she had engaged three Japanese warships and fired over 300 shells. The ships she had actually fired at were a Swedish merchantman, a German trawler, and a French schooner. As the fleet left Tangiers, one ship accidentally severed the city's underwater telegraph cable with her anchor, preventing communications with Europe for four days.

Concerns that the draught of the newer battleships, which had proven to be considerably greater than designed, would prevent their passage through the Suez Canal caused the fleet to separate after leaving Tangiers on 3 November 1904. The newer battleships and a few cruisers proceeded around the Cape of Good Hope under command of Admiral Rozhestvensky while the older battleships and lighter cruisers made their way through the Suez Canal under the command of Admiral von Felkerzam. They planned to rendezvous in Madagascar, and both sections of the fleet successfully completed this part of the journey. The fleet then proceeded to the Sea of Japan, where it was soundly defeated in the Battle of Tsushima.

On 25 November 1904, the British and the Russian governments signed a joint agreement in which they agreed to submit the issue to an international commission of inquiry whose proceedings were to be based on the Hague Convention. The International Commission met in Paris from 9 January to 25 February 1905. The report produced by the International Commission concluded that "the commissioners declare that their findings, which are therein formulated, are not, in their opinion, of a nature to cast any discredit upon the military qualities or the humanity of Admiral Rojdestvensky, or of the personnel of his squadron". It also concluded that "the commissioners take pleasure in recognising, unanimously, that Admiral Rozhestvensky personally did everything he could, from beginning to end of the incident, to prevent trawlers, recognised as such, from being fired upon by the squadron".

Russia voluntarily paid compensation of £66,000 to the fishermen. In 1906 the Fisherman's Memorial was unveiled in Hull to commemorate the deaths of the three British sailors. The memorial, approximately 18 feet high, shows the dead fisherman George Henry Smith and carries the following inscription:

References

Sources

External links
 
 Details and History of some of the Trawlers
 Hull In Print (article on an exhibition for the centenary of the incident)
 The Dogger Bank Incident

Naval battles of the Russo-Japanese War
Military history of County Durham
Military history of the North Sea
Military history of Yorkshire
1904 in international relations
Russia–United Kingdom relations
Conflicts in 1904
1904 in England
Military history of Kingston upon Hull
Maritime incidents in 1904
Maritime incidents in the United Kingdom
1900s in Yorkshire
October 1904 events
1904 disasters in the United Kingdom
Friendly fire incidents
Combat incidents